Villarrica is a town and municipality in the Tolima Department of Colombia.  The population of the municipality was 5,903 as of the 1993 census.  Most workers work in agriculture or cattle ranching.  The altitude is 863 meters above sea level.

The Villarrica region was inhabited in pre-Columbian times by the Cuindes and Cundayes.  Villarrica was hidden behind the Andes mountain range and a thick forest, and the indigenous population was to a great extent undisturbed until 1920, when Don Francisco Pineda López founded an estate called Villarica.  The municipality is named after this estate.

External links
 Municipality of Villarrica official website
 Government of Villarrica official website
 Blog about Villarrica

Municipalities of Tolima Department